Edoardo Pavan (born 14 June 1998) is an Italian football player. He plays for Verona.

Club career
He made his Serie C debut for Paganese on 16 September 2017 in a game against Akragas.

On 2 July 2019, he joined Pontedera on loan.

References

External links
 

1998 births
People from Legnago
Living people
Italian footballers
Association football defenders
Paganese Calcio 1926 players
U.S. Città di Pontedera players
Serie C players
Sportspeople from the Province of Verona
Footballers from Veneto